Harlon T. Barnett (born January 2, 1967) is an American football coach and former player.  Barnett previously served as Associate Head Coach/Co-Defensive Coordinator at Michigan State University as well as Defensive Coordinator/Defensive Backs Coach at Florida State University. He currently serves as the Secondary Coach at Michigan State University. As a player, Barnett was a four-year letter-winner as a defensive back for Michigan State University, serving as team captain and earning All-America honors during his senior year, and spent seven seasons in the National Football League.

Early life 
Barnett was born and raised in Cincinnati, Ohio, where he was a standout athlete at Princeton High School. Barnett earned a full athletic scholarship to play football at Michigan State University.

Playing career

NCAA 
Barnett was a three-year starter for Coach George Perles at Michigan State. His individual success as a Spartan earned him first-team All-America recognition by the Sporting News in 1989. In that season, Barnett compiled 73 stops, three interceptions, and three fumble recoveries. Barnett played on the 1987 Big Ten and 1988 Rose Bowl championship team and played in the 1989 Gator Bowl and the 1989 Aloha Bowl. He finished his career as a Spartan with 154 tackles, six interceptions, and 13 pass break-ups.

NFL 
Following his impressive career at Michigan State, Barnett was drafted by the Cleveland Browns in the fourth round of the 1990 NFL Draft. He played three seasons (1990–92) in Cleveland before spending two seasons (1993–94) with the New England Patriots and two seasons (1995–96) with the Minnesota Vikings.

Broadcasting career 
Barnett earned his bachelor's degree in communication from Michigan State in 1990. He went to broadcasting school while playing for the Cleveland Browns. Barnett was recruited in 1997 by then Michigan State head coach Nick Saban to serve as a sideline reporter for Michigan State football. He served as a sideline reporter for Coach Saban’s final two seasons at Michigan State.

Coaching career

Louisiana State University 
The next time Barnett interviewed with Coach Saban, it was for a graduate assistant opening on Coach Saban's LSU football staff. In Barnett's sole season as a GA at LSU, the Tigers won the 2004 Sugar Bowl (BCS National Championship Game).

University of Cincinnati 
The following season, Barnett was hired as Defensive Backs Coach at the University of Cincinnati under Coach Mark Dantonio. In his initial season (2004), the Bearcats led Conference USA and ranked No. 26 nationally in pass defense, allowing only 194.2 yards per game. In his final season at Cincinnati (2006), the Bearcats ranked No. 23 nationally in pass efficiency defense, with a 109.3 rating. In 3 seasons at the University of Cincinnati, Barnett coached four defensive backs to all-conference honors.

Michigan State University 
Barnett returned to his alma mater in 2007 - this time as a coach. In Barnett's first 11 seasons in East Lansing, the Spartans were 100-45 with three Big Ten Championships (2010, 2013, 2015) and were selected for the College Football Playoff in 2015. He coached the defensive backs his entire 11 years under Coach Dantonio; he was promoted to Assistant Head Coach and Co-Defensive Coordinator prior to Michigan State's victory in the 2015 Cotton Bowl Classic over Baylor, and was again promoted to Associate Head Coach in June 2017.

Florida State University 
Barnett also spent two seasons as Defensive Coordinator at Florida State University under Coach Willie Taggart. Barnett’s experience at Florida State was integral to his development as injuries forced him to experiment with foreign schemes and coverages. Ultimately, his time was cut short at Florida State after Coach Taggart’s head coaching contract was bought out early.

Player Development and Success 
Barnett is known for his success in developing players at the University of Cincinnati, Michigan State University and Florida State University. In 3 seasons at the University of Cincinnati, Barnett coached four defensive backs to all-conference honors. For Michigan State University, Barnett has coached 10 Spartan defensive backs who have been selected in the NFL Draft, two of whom were first round picks (Darqueze Dennard, No. 24, Cincinnati Bengals, 2014; and Trae Waynes, No. 11, Minnesota Vikings, 2015), four All-Americans, three Thorpe Award semifinalists, and one Thorpe Award recipient.

During his time with the Florida State University, Barnett coached five players who earned All-ACC recognition, a Bednarick Award semifinalist, and five players selected in the NFL Draft (Brian Burns, No. 16, Carolina Panthers, 2019; Asante Samuel Jr., No. 47, Los Angeles Chargers, 2021; Janarius Robinson, No. 134, Minnesota Vikings, 2021; Joshua Kaindoh, No. 144, Kansas City Chiefs, 2021; Hamsah Nasirildeen, No. 186, New York Jets, 2021).

Personal life 
Barnett married his college sweetheart, Tammy Barnett, in 1991 and they have two children, Todd and Tori.

Barnett is a Christian and speaks openly about the importance of his faith. He often speaks of his own life experiences to advance what he views as his purpose - developing young men into men.

References

External links
 Florida State profile
 Michigan State profile

1967 births
Living people
American football safeties
Cincinnati Bearcats football coaches
LSU Tigers football coaches
Cleveland Browns players
Michigan State Spartans football coaches
Florida State Seminoles football coaches
Michigan State Spartans football players
Minnesota Vikings players
New England Patriots players
High school football coaches in Ohio
Players of American football from Cincinnati
African-American coaches of American football
African-American players of American football
21st-century African-American people
20th-century African-American sportspeople